Chlorophytum (common name spider plant), is a genus of almost 200 species of evergreen perennial flowering plants in the century plant subfamily within the asparagus family. The plants are native to the tropical and subtropical regions of Africa, Australia, and Asia.

They grow to 10–60 cm tall, with a rosette of long, slender leaves 15–75 cm long and 0.5–2 cm broad and thick, fleshy tuberous roots. The flowers are small, usually white, produced on sparse panicles up to 120 cm long; in some species the plants also reproduce vegetatively by means of plantlets, tiny plants that take root on touching the ground.

Chlorophytum comosum, the common Spider Plant, a native of South Africa, is a very popular houseplant especially in its variegated form 'Vittatum'. It is commonly grown in hanging pots suspended by ropes or wires in bright sunlight.

Chlorophytum borivilianum is a native of India and it is used and grown as a medicinal plant.

Species, subspecies, and varieties
The World Checklist of Selected Plant Families recognized 191 species :

 Chlorophytum acutum (C.H.Wright) Nordal
 Chlorophytum affine Baker
 Chlorophytum affine var. affine
 Chlorophytum affine var. curviscapum (Poelln.) Hanid
 Chlorophytum africanum (Baker) Baker
 Chlorophytum alismifolium Baker
 Chlorophytum alpinum Benth. ex Baker
 Chlorophytum altum Engl. & K.Krause
 Chlorophytum amplexicaule Baker
 Chlorophytum anceps (Baker) Kativu
 Chlorophytum andongense Baker
 Chlorophytum angulicaule (Baker) Kativu
 Chlorophytum angustiracemosum Poelln.
 Chlorophytum angustissimum (Poelln.) Nordal
 Chlorophytum ankarense H.Perrier
 Chlorophytum appendiculatum H.Perrier
 Chlorophytum applanatum Nordal & Thulin
 Chlorophytum arcuatoramosum R.B.Drumm.
 Chlorophytum aridum Oberm.
 Chlorophytum arundinaceum Baker
 Chlorophytum aureum Engl.
 Chlorophytum basitrichum Poelln.
 Chlorophytum baturense K.Krause
 Chlorophytum benuense Engl. & K.Krause
 Chlorophytum bharuchae Ansari, Sundararagh. & Hemadri
 Chlorophytum bifolium Dammer
 Chlorophytum blepharophyllum Schweinf. ex Baker
 Chlorophytum blepharophyllum subsp. blepharophyllum
 Chlorophytum blepharophyllum subsp. pendulum Hoell & Nordal
 Chlorophytum blepharophyllum subsp. rubropygmaeum Bjorå & Nordal
 Chlorophytum borivilianum Santapau & R.R.Fern.
 Chlorophytum bowkeri Baker
 Chlorophytum brachystachyum Baker
 Chlorophytum bracteatum Hua
 Chlorophytum brevipedunculatum Poelln.
 Chlorophytum breviscapum Dalzell
 Chlorophytum bulbinifolium Hoell & Nordal
 Chlorophytum burundiense Meerts
 Chlorophytum calyptrocarpum (Baker) Kativu
 Chlorophytum cameronii (Baker) Kativu
 Chlorophytum cameronii var. cameronii
 Chlorophytum cameronii var. grantii (Baker) Nordal
 Chlorophytum cameronii var. purpuratum (Rendle) Govaerts
 Chlorophytum camporum Engl. & K.Krause
 Chlorophytum capense (L.) Voss
 Chlorophytum caudatibracteatum Engl. & K.Krause
 Chlorophytum caulescens (Baker) Marais & Reilly
 Chlorophytum chelindaense Kativu & Nordal
 Chlorophytum chevalieri Poelln.
 Chlorophytum chinense Bureau & Franch.
 Chlorophytum chloranthum Baker
 Chlorophytum clarae Bjorå & Nordal
 Chlorophytum collinum (Poelln.) Nordal
 Chlorophytum colubrinum (Baker) Engl.
 Chlorophytum comosum (Thunb.) Jacques 
 Chlorophytum cooperi (Baker) Nordal
 Chlorophytum cordifolium De Wild.
 Chlorophytum crassinerve (Baker) Oberm.
 Chlorophytum crispum (Thunb.) Baker
 Chlorophytum cyperaceum (Kies) Nordal
 Chlorophytum dalzielii (Hutch. ex Hepper) Nordal
 Chlorophytum debile Baker
 Chlorophytum decaryanum H.Perrier
 Chlorophytum decipiens Baker
 Chlorophytum densiflorum Engl.
 Chlorophytum dianellifolium (Baker) H.Perrier
 Chlorophytum distichum H.Perrier
 Chlorophytum dolichocarpum Tamura
 Chlorophytum ducis-aprutii Chiov.
 Chlorophytum fasciculatum (Baker) Kativu
 Chlorophytum filifolium Nordal & Thulin
 Chlorophytum filipendulum Baker
 Chlorophytum filipendulum subsp. filipendulum
 Chlorophytum filipendulum subsp. amaniense (Engl.) Nordal & A.D.Poulsen
 Chlorophytum fischeri (Baker) Baker
 Chlorophytum gallabatense Schweinf. ex Baker
 Chlorophytum galpinii (Baker) Kativu
 Chlorophytum galpinii var. galpinii
 Chlorophytum galpinii var. matabelense (Baker) Kativu
 Chlorophytum galpinii var. norlindhii (Weim.) Kativu
 Chlorophytum geayanum (H.Perrier) Marais & Reilly
 Chlorophytum geophilum Peter ex Poelln.
 Chlorophytum glaucoides Blatt.
 Chlorophytum glaucum Dalzell
 Chlorophytum goetzei Engl.
 Chlorophytum gothanense Malpure & S.R.Yadav
 Chlorophytum gracile Baker
 Chlorophytum graminifolium (Willd.) Kunth
 Chlorophytum graniticola Kativu
 Chlorophytum graniticum H.Perrier
 Chlorophytum graptophyllum (Baker) Marais & Reilly
 Chlorophytum haygarthii J.M.Wood & M.S.Evans
 Chlorophytum herrmannii Nordal & Sebsebe
 Chlorophytum heynei Baker
 Chlorophytum hiranense Nordal & Thulin
 Chlorophytum hirsutum A.D.Poulsen & Nordal
 Chlorophytum holstii Engl.
 Chlorophytum humbertianum H.Perrier
 Chlorophytum humifusum Cufod.
 Chlorophytum hypoxiforme (H.Perrier) Marais & Reilly
 Chlorophytum hysteranthum Kativu
 Chlorophytum immaculatum (Hepper) Nordal
 Chlorophytum inconspicuum (Baker) Nordal
 Chlorophytum indicum (Willd. ex Schult. & Schult.f.) Dress
 Chlorophytum inornatum Ker Gawl.
 Chlorophytum intermedium Craib
 Chlorophytum kolhapurense Sardesai, S.P.Gaikwad & S.R.Yadav
 Chlorophytum krauseanum (Dinter) Kativu
 Chlorophytum krookianum Zahlbr.
 Chlorophytum lancifolium Welw. ex Baker
 Chlorophytum lancifolium subsp. lancifolium
 Chlorophytum lancifolium subsp. cordatum (Engl.) A.D.Poulsen & Nordal
 Chlorophytum lancifolium subsp. togoense (Engl.) A.D.Poulsen & Nordal
 Chlorophytum latifolium Engl. & K.Krause
 Chlorophytum laxum R.Br.
 Chlorophytum leptoneurum (C.H.Wright) Poelln.
 Chlorophytum lewisae Oberm.
 Chlorophytum limosum (Baker) Nordal
 Chlorophytum littorale Nordal & Thulin
 Chlorophytum longifolium Schweinf. ex Baker
 Chlorophytum longiscapum Dammer
 Chlorophytum longissimum Ridl.
 Chlorophytum macrophyllum (A.Rich.) Asch.
 Chlorophytum macrorrhizum Poelln.
 Chlorophytum macrosporum Baker
 Chlorophytum madagascariense Baker
 Chlorophytum malabaricum Baker
 Chlorophytum malayense Ridl.
 Chlorophytum micranthum Baker
 Chlorophytum minor Kativu
 Chlorophytum modestum Baker
 Chlorophytum monophyllum Oberm.
 Chlorophytum namaquense Schltr. ex Poelln.
 Chlorophytum namorokense H.Perrier
 Chlorophytum nepalense (Lindl.) Baker
 Chlorophytum nervatum (C.H.Wright) Poelln.
 Chlorophytum nervosum Nordal & Thulin
 Chlorophytum nidulans (Baker) Brenan
 Chlorophytum nimmonii Dalzell
 Chlorophytum nubicum (Baker) Kativu
 Chlorophytum nyasae (Rendle) Kativu
 Chlorophytum nzii A.Chev. ex Hepper
 Chlorophytum occultum A.D.Poulsen & Nordal
 Chlorophytum orchidastrum Lindl.
 Chlorophytum parkeri (Baker) Marais & Reilly
 Chlorophytum parvulum Chiov.
 Chlorophytum paucinervatum (Poelln.) Nordal
 Chlorophytum pauciphyllum Oberm.
 Chlorophytum pauper Poelln.
 Chlorophytum pendulum Nordal & Thulin
 Chlorophytum peralbum Poelln.
 Chlorophytum perfoliatum Kativu
 Chlorophytum petraeum Nordal & Thulin
 Chlorophytum petrophilum K.Krause
 Chlorophytum pilosissimum Engl. & K.Krause
 Chlorophytum polystachys Baker
 Chlorophytum pseudocaule Tesfaye & Nordal
 Chlorophytum pterocarpum Nordal & Thulin
 Chlorophytum puberulum Engl.
 Chlorophytum pubiflorum Baker
 Chlorophytum pusillum Schweinf. ex Baker
 Chlorophytum pygmaeum (Weim.) Kativu
 Chlorophytum pygmaeum subsp. pygmaeum
 Chlorophytum pygmaeum subsp. rhodesianum (Rendle) Kativu
 Chlorophytum radula (Baker) Nordal
 Chlorophytum ramosissimum Nordal & Thulin
 Chlorophytum rangei (Engl. & K.Krause) Nordal
 Chlorophytum recurvifolium (Baker) C.Archer & Kativu
 Chlorophytum reflexibracteatum Poelln.
 Chlorophytum rhizopendulum Bjorå & Hemp
 Chlorophytum rigidum Kunth
 Chlorophytum ruahense Engl.
 Chlorophytum rubribracteatum (De Wild.) Kativu
 Chlorophytum rutenbergianum Vatke
 Chlorophytum saundersiae (Baker) Nordal
 Chlorophytum scabrum Baker
 Chlorophytum senegalense (Baker) Hepper
 Chlorophytum serpens Sebsebe & Nordal
 Chlorophytum silvaticum Dammer
 Chlorophytum simplex Craib
 Chlorophytum sofiense (H.Perrier) Marais & Reilly
 Chlorophytum somaliense Baker
 Chlorophytum sparsiflorum Baker
 Chlorophytum sparsiflorum var. sparsiflorum
 Chlorophytum sparsiflorum var. bipindense (Engl. & K.Krause) Bjorå & Nordal
 Chlorophytum sphacelatum (Baker) Kativu
 Chlorophytum staudtii Nordal
 Chlorophytum stenopetalum Baker
 Chlorophytum stolzii (K.Krause) Weim.
 Chlorophytum subligulatum H.Perrier
 Chlorophytum subpetiolatum (Baker) Kativu
 Chlorophytum suffruticosum Baker
 Chlorophytum superpositum (Baker) Marais & Reilly
 Chlorophytum sylvestre Bardot-Vaucoulon
 Chlorophytum tenerrimum Peter ex Poelln.
 Chlorophytum tetraphyllum (L.f.) Baker
 Chlorophytum transvaalense (Baker) Kativu
 Chlorophytum trichophlebium (Baker) Nordal
 Chlorophytum triflorum (Aiton) Kunth
 Chlorophytum tripedale (Baker) H.Perrier
Chlorophytum tuberosum (Roxb.) Baker
 Chlorophytum unyikense Engl.
 Chlorophytum velutinum Kativu
 Chlorophytum vestitum Baker
 Chlorophytum viridescens Engl.
 Chlorophytum viscosum Kunth
 Chlorophytum waibelii K.Krause
 Chlorophytum warneckei (Engl.) Marais & Reilly
 Chlorophytum zambiense Bjorå & Nordal
 Chlorophytum zavattarii (Cufod.) Nordal
 Chlorophytum zingiberastrum Nordal & A.D.Poulsen

References

External links

Asparagaceae genera
Agavoideae